Trans World Sport (TWS), originally stylised Transworld Sport (still used in some television listings and electronic programme guides) is a sports-orientated television programme produced by IMG Media in London, England.  It is shown worldwide, on a variety of syndicated television channels. It is the world's longest running weekly international television sports programme, and has been in continuous production every week since .  Today, it is shown over fifty countries, with a household reach of nearly two-hundred million.  For over 25 years, Trans World Sport has brought the top names and events, together with off-beat and esoteric stories from the world of sport.

The show was the brainchild of IMG founder, and sports marketing pioneer, Mark McCormack. Since its very first show, Trans World Sport's objective has remained the same; to bring its viewers the best, the most interesting, and most informative stories from the world of sport.  Their mantra has always been that there is no hierarchy in sport, and the idea is that what happens in La Liga has always been as important as what happens at the Sepak Takraw World Championship.  They have had features on several sports stars, including a 16 year-old Carlos Alcaraz, a 14-year-old Tiger Woods, a teenage Virat Kohli, Usain Bolt, and Roger Federer, and on a 12-year-old Venus Williams and her 11-year-old sister, Serena Williams.

Trans World Sport has covered hundreds of different sports, and filmed with a countless number of World and Olympic champions.  Out of the 203 International Olympic Committee (IOC) member nations, they have been to 183 of them; including North Korea and Papua New Guinea, while in 2012, they even filmed in Somalia.

The first show was narrated by Gerald Sinstadt, and after a succession of different narrators in the early nineties, the show settled on its current narrator: Sue Carpenter.

Bruce Hammal narrated the programme between 1989 and 2017.

See also

Mobil 1 The Grid

References

External links 
Trans World Sport – official website, at IMGprogramming.com

1987 British television series debuts
1980s British sports television series
1990s British sports television series
2000s British sports television series
2010s British sports television series
2020s British sports television series
Channel 4 original programming
Sports television in the United Kingdom